The 2020 Atlanta FaZe season was the first season of the Atlanta FaZe's existence in the Call of Duty League.

Preceding offseason 
On May 2, 2019, Activision Blizzard announced that Atlanta Esports Ventures had purchased one of the first five franchise slots for the Call of Duty League.AEV and FaZe Clan partnered together for the team, and in October 2019, they announced that the team would be named the Atlanta FaZe. Atlanta would announce its inaugural season roster the same month.

Overview 
Atlanta Faze would finish the regular season in first place with a 26 - 7 record, this granted them a 2-round bye and placed them in to winners bracket round 3. The team finished in second, earning them $900,000 in prize money.

Final roster

Standings

Game log

Regular season

Playoffs

References

External links
 

Atlanta FaZe
Atlanta FaZe seasons